San Miguel County is a county located in the U.S. state of Colorado. As of the 2020 census, the population was 8,072. The county seat is Telluride. The county is named for the San Miguel River.

History
San Miguel County was given the Spanish language name for "Saint Michael" due to the nearby San Miguel River. On 27 February 1883, Ouray County was split to form San Miguel County.  Originally the San Miguel County portion was to retain the name Ouray County with the new portion called Uncompahgre County.

Mining operators in the San Juan mountain area of Colorado formed the San Juan District Mining Association (SJDMA) in 1903, as a direct result of a Western Federation of Miners proposal to the Telluride Mining Association for the eight-hour day, which had been approved in a referendum by 72 percent of Colorado voters. The new association consolidated the power of thirty-six mining properties in San Miguel, Ouray, and San Juan counties. The SJDMA refused to consider any reduction in hours or increase in wages, helping to provoke a bitter strike.

In 1875, the Smuggler gold vein was discovered near Telluride.  The Smuggler-Union, Tomboy, and Liberty Bell mines combined produced over a hundred tons of gold by 1920, third in the state of Colorado.

Geography

Adjacent counties
 Montrose County - north
 Ouray County - east
 San Juan County - southeast
 Dolores County - south
 San Juan County, Utah - west

Major highways
  State Highway 62
  State Highway 141
  State Highway 145

National protected areas
Lizard Head Wilderness
Mount Sneffels Wilderness
Old Spanish National Historic Trail
Telluride National Historic District
Uncompahgre National Forest

Trails and byways
Great Parks Bicycle Route
San Juan Skyway National Scenic Byway
Unaweep/Tabeguache Scenic and Historic Byway
Western Express Bicycle Route

Demographics

At the 2000 census there were 6,594 people, 3,015 households, and 1,423 families living in the county.  The population density was 5 people per square mile (2/km2).  There were 5,197 housing units at an average density of 4 per square mile (2/km2).  The racial makeup of the county was 93.57% White, 0.29% Black or African American, 0.85% Native American, 0.74% Asian, 0.08% Pacific Islander, 3.37% from other races, and 1.11% from two or more races.  8.6% of the population were Hispanic or Latino of any race.
Of the 3,015 households 22.80% had children under the age of 18 living with them, 38.30% were married couples living together, 5.40% had a female householder with no husband present, and 52.80% were non-families. 32.70% of households were one person and 2.50% were one person aged 65 or older.  The average household size was 2.18 and the average family size was 2.77.

The age distribution was 17.60% under the age of 18, 9.90% from 18 to 24, 43.30% from 25 to 44, 25.80% from 45 to 64, and 3.40% 65 or older.  The median age was 34 years. For every 100 females there were 120.80 males.  For every 100 females age eighteen 18 and over, there were 126.40 males.

The median household income was $48,514 and the median family income  was $60,417. Males had a median income of $35,922 versus $30,278 for females. The per capita income for the county was $35,329.  About 6.60% of families and 10.40% of the population were below the poverty line, including 11.10% of those under age 18 and 8.00% of those age 65 or over.

In June 2021, U.S. News & World Report ranked the San Miguel County as having the best life expectancy in the United States at 100+ years old.

Politics
For most of the 20th century, San Miguel County was a national bellwether. It voted for the winner in every presidential election from 1912 to 1984. Since 1988, the county has become one of the most Democratic in Colorado and the nation, largely due to the presence of the Telluride Ski Resort and the influx of liberal-minded voters in the 1960s and 1970s. These trends have made San Miguel similar in vein to other heavily Democratic ski resort counties like Blaine County in Idaho, Teton County in Wyoming, and Pitkin County within Colorado. In the 2000 presidential election, San Miguel County was Green Party candidate Ralph Nader's best countywide performance in the country with 17.2% of the vote.

Communities

Towns
Mountain Village
Norwood
Ophir
Sawpit
Telluride

Census-designated place 

 Placerville

Unincorporated Communities
Ames
Egnar
Pandora
Sams
Slick Rock
Tomboy (ghost town)

See also

Outline of Colorado
Index of Colorado-related articles
National Register of Historic Places listings in San Miguel County, Colorado

References

External links
San Miguel County Government website
Colorado County Evolution by Don Stanwyck
Colorado Historical Society

 

 
Colorado counties
1883 establishments in Colorado
Populated places established in 1883